Darwin College Bridges are the fourth and fifth river Cam bridges overall and two first bridges on its middle stream in Cambridge. Bridges made of timber connect the college grounds with the college's two islands.

See also
List of bridges in Cambridge
Template:River Cam map

References

Bridges in Cambridge
Bridges across the River Cam
Pedestrian bridges in England
Truss bridges in England
Beam bridges in England
Wooden bridges in the United Kingdom
Darwin College, Cambridge